Khatib is a historic and ancient district of Tabriz, Iran.  The founding of this district is attributed to Khatib Tabrizi.

Famous people
 Rasoul Khatibi

Sources

 Khatib

Districts of Tabriz